, or Reiyūkai Shakaden, is a Japanese Buddhist new religious movement founded in 1919 by Kakutarō Kubo (1892-1944) and Kimi Kotani (1901-1971). It is a lay organization (there are no priests) inspired by Nichiren Buddhism, but not affiliated to any particular sect.

Reiyūkai considers itself the grandfather of lay-based new religions devoted to the Lotus Sutra and ancestor veneration.Reiyūkai membership currently stands at 5.14 million members, with the majority living in Japan.

History 
In 1920s, during the crisis after the 1923 Great Kantō earthquake and the following economic depression, Kakutaro Kubo begins formulating his philosophy for what is now Reiyūkai. He compiled and published The Blue Sutra (a collection of texts from the Threefold Lotus Sutra), used by members for recitation practice.

In 1930, Reiyūkai was formally inaugurated, Kakutaro Kubo became Chairman of the Board of Directors and Kimi Kotani becomes President. In 1937, headquarters were established the Iikura area, Tokyo. In 1954, the Reiyūkai Youth Group was inaugurated.

In 1971 Kimi Kotani died and Tsugunari Kubo became president. The next year, a Reiyūkai Centre was established in the United States. It was followed by centers in Brazil and Canada (1975); the Philippines (1976); Mexico, Italy, and Taiwan (1977); United Kingdom (1978, closed as of March 1998); Peru, Thailand, and France (1979); India, Nepal, and Paraguay (1983); Spain (1984); Korea (1988); Bolivia (1996) and Sri Lanka (1999). In 1980, the Reiyūkai’s Inner Self Development campaign began.

In 1978, Statistic public body counts in Japan 2,838,000 members, that is 2,46% of total population 

In 1985, representatives from 14 countries participated in a Youth Speech Festival in commemoration of United Nations International Youth Year. Since then, national festivals are held annually throughout the world and international festivals are held in the Asian, American and European regions on a regular basis.

In 1990, the Sixth International Youth Year Speech Festival was held in Osaka, Japan, as part of the International Garden and Greenery Expo ’90. Representatives from 17 countries attended.

In 1992, Reiyūkai International Operation for Cambodian Relief (RIOCR) opened its office in Cambodia. The next year, Reiyūkai International Committee was inaugurated.

In 1994, the Tenth International Youth Year Speech Festival was held in Kathmandu, Nepal. 
In 1996 Tsugunari Kubo resigned as President of Reiyūkai and Yae Hamaguchi became her successor. The Reiyūkai-sponsored Lumbini International Research Institute (LIRI) was inaugurated in Nepal and the International College for Advance Buddhist Studies (ICABS) was established in Tokyo. The First Reiyūkai Supervisory Council was inaugurated.

In 1999, Reiyūkai established Japanese and English homepages on the Internet. In 2000, the 4th Reiyūkai International Conference was held in Tokyo. Yae Hamaguchi died, and Ichitaro Ohgata succeeded as President, Yushun Masunaga and Hiromichi Hirakawa as Vice Presidents.

In August 2004, the Reiyūkai sponsored, together with Japan International Cooperation Agency (JICA), the UN World Food Program and the Nikkei newspaper, the World Youth Peace Summit (WYPS) Japan conference, as a direct outcome of the Asia-Pacific Regional Conference. It was held at the United Nations University in Tokyo. Over 400 youth delegates engaged in lively discussion and decided to mark the date, August 5th, as International Youth Peace Day and will organize an event on that day each year. The summit was broadcast by the Japanese national broadcaster, NHK, on its BS Forum.

In 2007, thanks to the contribution of members of Reiyukai Eurasia community, as an NGO committed to rural development acting in India and Nepal, a new eye hospital, the Reiyukai Eiko Masunaga Eye Hospital, was established in Nepal.

From April 8, 2013, Masaharu Sueyoshi is currently the Reiyūkai International President.

Reiyukai France is member of the European Buddhist Union (EBU) since 1997.

Relevant places

Shakaden 

"Shakaden" in the name Reiyūkai Shakaden means that this organization lays extra emphasis on the veneration of Shakyamuni Buddha, the founder of Buddhism.
The Shakaden is an architectural complex that serves as a meeting place and social center for Reiyūkai members in the local community. In Japanese, "Shakaden" means the "House of Shakyamuni." It is a place where anyone can seek to further practice the teachings of Shakyamuni Buddha. It consists of the Main Hall, the Plaza, the Kotani Hall, various conference rooms, a cafeteria, a child care room, and a nurse's office. After four years of construction, the Shakaden was completed in 1975.
Shakaden is a 3 minute walk from Kamiyacho subway stop, Hibiya Line.

Mirokusan 
It is on the side of Togasa Mountain in the center of the Amagi Mountain Range on the Izu Peninsula; its building was strongly supported by Kimi Kotani, as a meeting point for young people, for an immersive visit in a natural environment, where to exchange experiences with other members. It was completed in 1964.

Derived movements 
Reiyukai has experienced a number of splits headed by some members; further offshoots from Reiyūkai are Risshō Kōsei Kai,  Bussho Gonenkai Kyōdan, Myōchikai Kyōdan, and Myōdōkai Kyōdan.

Political influence 
Reiyukai is a pacifist movement. For Reiyukai, peace can be achieved through the promotion of one’s personal development for the benefit of all humanity.
The Inner Trip Ideologue Research Center (IIC) was founded to raise awareness about the value and importance of engaging people within society, fulfilling one’s civic responsibilities, and participating in the political process. As an opportunity to deepen the knowledge of politics and to transmit the voices of people, the IIC organizes various lectures and seminars in different locations within Japan inviting politicians as guest speakers. Also, the IIC publishes a monthly magazine providing a space for politicians to present their political viewpoints.
Former Tokyo governor Shintaro Ishihara is a believer and writes in Reiyūkai publications.

Ms Claudine Shinoda, of Reiyukai France, has been president of EBU for 3 years and vice-president for 6 years. In this role, she was a speaker in various international meetings:
- in an UN event at Bangkok in May 2007 : Speech on Buddhism and  governance;
- at UNESCO at Paris in October 2006 on European Buddhism;
- at the European Parliament in Bruxelles in 2008 : Discours sur la place des femmes dans le bouddhisme Reiyukai lors du Colloque sur la place des femmes dans le bouddhisme.
The Committee on Non-Governmental Organizations (NGO) of United Nations, opening its regular session for 2015, recommended 16 organizations for special consultative status with the United Nations Economic and Social Council, including Reiyūkai Eurasia.

References

Literature
Deal, William E.; Ruppert, Brian (2015), A Cultural History of Japanese Buddhism: John Wiley & Sons. p. 222-
Chryssides, George D. (2012), Rowman & Littlefield, Historical Dictionary of New Religious Movements (2nd edition), p. 293
 Buswell, Robert E., Lopez, Donald S. Jr. (2014). The Princeton Dictionary of Buddhism, Princeton: Princeton University Press, p. 709 (Reiyūkai)
 Hardacre, Helen (1984). Lay Buddhism in Contemporary Japan: Reiyukai Kyodan, Princeton Univ Press. 
 Hardacre, Helen (1979). Sex-role norms and values in Reiyūkai, Japanese Journal of Religious Studies 6 (3), 445-460
 Kubo, Katsuko; O'Drobinak, Charles J.; trans. (1982). Reflections in search of myself, Tokyo: Sangaku Publishing
 Kubo Tsugunari, Yuyama Akira (tr.) The Lotus Sutra. Revised 2nd ed. Berkeley, Calif. : Numata Center for Buddhist Translation and Research 2007.
Kubo Tsugunari, The philosophical foundation of the lay Buddhist practice of the Reiyukai, as depicted in the Lotus Sūtra (1988, first edition)
Montgomery, Daniel (1991). Fire in the Lotus, The Dynamic Religion of Nichiren, London: Mandala, 
 Lai, Whalen (1985), Review of: Helen Hardacre, Lay Buddhism in Contemporary Japan: Reiyūkai Kyōdan, Japanese Journal of Religious Studies 12 (4), 358-362

External links
 Inner Trip Reiyukai International
 Reiyukai - Japan
 Reiyukai Youth - Japan
 Eurasia Reiyukai
 The Inner Trip Foundation

Religious organizations based in Japan
Nichiren Buddhism
Religious organizations established in 1920
Japanese new religions